Soumya Ramakrishnan is an Indian playback singer, working in the Malayalam film industry. She made her debut in the Malayalam film industry after doing some jingles, with 'Thane padum' in ‘Arabikkatha'. It was ‘Vakkinullile’ from the movie ‘Ozhimuri’, directed by Madhupal that won her several plaudits. Other songs including ‘We are in Love’ (Minnaminnikoottam), ‘Chiraku veeshi’ (‘Violin’) and ‘Athira’ (Apoorvaragam), Vaakkinullile (Ozhimuri), Muthumani mazhayay (Idiots), Neelakarmukil (Cleopatra), ee pooveyilil (Pakida), Zindagi ki Raah mein (Angry Babies in love), Mazhanila Kulirumai (Vikramadhithyan) and Enthaanu Khalbe (KL 10 Patthu).

Personal life 

Soumya was born on 21 July 1984 in a musical family in Ernakulam. She has done her graduation in Botany from St. Teresa's College, Ernakulam and further full-time post graduation in management from TKM Institute of Management, Kollam.

Career 
She is a disciple of renowned musicians Sri. Cochin Viswanathan and Sri. Mohan Kumar. She started her singing career through Jingles (Lunar footwears) with the help of national award-winning music director Bijibal which paved a way for winning the opportunity for singing in her first film Arabikadha. A few of her popular jingles would include station anthem-Mazhathum Veylathum for Club FM 94.3, Nilakkatha Jeevathalam for visual media-Media one, Dhathri etc. Soumya was in-turn introduced to films by Bijibal through Arabikadha (thane padum veene). Other music directors with whom she has worked include Nandhu Kartha for the movie Idiots and Sangeetha Varma for the movie Cleopatra.

Discography

Malayalam

References 

Living people
Malayalam playback singers
Singers from Kochi
1984 births
Indian women playback singers
21st-century Indian women singers
21st-century Indian singers
St. Teresa's College alumni